Ameet Sampat (born 24 February 1977) is a cricketer who played for the Oman national cricket team. He made his List A debut on 24 November 2007 in the 2007 ICC World Cricket League Division Two.

References

External links
 

1977 births
Living people
Omani cricketers
People from Muscat, Oman
Indian expatriates in Oman